John Kyle Mitchell (born August 11, 1965) is an American former professional baseball pitcher. He pitched in parts of five Major League Baseball (MLB) seasons (–) for the New York Mets and Baltimore Orioles.

Boating accident
Mitchell was drafted by the Boston Red Sox in the 1983 Major League Baseball draft. On October 30, after completing his first professional season with the New York–Penn League's Elmira Pioneers, Mitchell and two fellow Red Sox farmhands, Anthony Latham and Scott Skripko, were deep-sea fishing off the coast of Florida when their boat capsized. Boat owner Mark Zastrowmy and Latham drowned. Skripko and Mitchell survived over twenty hours in the water by clinging to debris; Skripko held onto a cooler for 20 hours and Mitchell a bucket for 22 hours.

Professional career

Ojeda trade
After two more seasons with the Red sox organization, Mitchell was traded to the Mets along with Bob Ojeda, Tom McCarthy and Chris Bayer for Calvin Schiraldi, John Christensen, Wes Gardner and La Schelle Tarver on November 15, . Mitchell went 12–9 with a 3.39 earned run average in his first season with the Tidewater Tides, and received a call-up to the MLB that September. His MLB debut came on September 8, against the Montreal Expos at Shea Stadium.

Despite winning just three games, he pitched decently in 19 starts. He spent most of the next two seasons at Tidewater, pitching just three games and four innings at the major league level.

Baltimore Orioles
Following the 1989 season, Mitchell and Joaquin Contreras were traded to the Baltimore Orioles for Cesar Mejia and Keith Hughes. In Baltimore, Mitchell set his career high in wins with six, but his ERA was a sub-par 4.64. He never again pitched in the majors.

Later minor league career
He sat out the entire 1992 season, then started  with the independent Sioux Falls Canaries. He pitched well enough to earn another chance from the Red Sox. Overall, Mitchell went 97–82 with a 3.34 ERA as a minor leaguer.

Career MLB statistics

Personal life
Mitchell lives in Nashville, Tennessee, where he works for a company that makes municipal castings. He is married with four children. His middle child, Johnny Latham Mitchell is named in memory of his fallen teammate. His brother is former Red Sox pitcher Charlie Mitchell.

References

External links

1965 births
Living people
American expatriate baseball players in Canada
Baltimore Orioles players
Baseball players from Tennessee
Calgary Cannons players
Columbia Mules players
Elmira Pioneers players
Major League Baseball pitchers
New Britain Red Sox players
New York Mets players
Newark Bears players
Oklahoma City 89ers players
Ottawa Lynx players
People from Dickson, Tennessee
Rochester Red Wings players
Sioux Falls Canaries players
Tidewater Tides players
Winter Haven Red Sox players
Survivors of seafaring accidents or incidents